Spassky Uyezd (Спа́сский уе́зд) was one of the subdivisions of the Kazan Governorate of the Russian Empire. It was situated in the southeastern part of the governorate. Its administrative centre was Spassk (Bolgar).

Demographics
At the time of the Russian Empire Census of 1897, Spassky Uyezd had a population of 175,198. Of these, 58.4% spoke Russian, 30.2% Tatar, 7.2% Chuvash and 4.1% Mordvin as their native language.

References

 
Uezds of Kazan Governorate
Kazan Governorate